Louis-Auguste-Augustin d'Affry (Versailles, 28 February 1713 – Saint-Barthélemy, 10 June 1793) was a Swiss military officer and diplomat under the French kings Louis XV and Louis XVI.

Biography 
Louis-Auguste-Augustin d'Affry was born in Versailles, France to Lieutenant-General François d'Affry (1667-1734) and Marie-Madeleine de Diesbach Steinbrugg, both from Fribourg, Switzerland. Members of the d'Affry family had served as mercenaries in French service nearly uninterruptedly since 1538. He joined the Swiss Guards as a cadet in 1725, and in 1734 fought at the Battle of Guastalla where his father was killed.

He was promoted to brigadier in 1744, field marshal in 1748 and lieutenant-general in 1758. In 1767, d'Affry was made colonel of the Swiss Guards. He served as Louis XV's representative to the Dutch Republic from 1755 to 1762, and was the unofficial ambassador of the Old Swiss Confederacy to the French court. From 1771 until 1792, d'Affry was in charge of all Swiss troops in French service.

At the start of the French Revolution, d'Affry's failing health prevented him from acting during the Storming of the Bastille on 14 July 1789. After Louis XVI's flight to Varennes in June 1791, he was appointed commander of the military division of Paris and Île-de-France and took an oath of allegiance to the National Constituent Assembly. Refusing to compromise his troops in counter-revolutionary activity, d'Affry endeavored to maintain the Swiss military presence in France while keeping it neutral from political affairs. 

Due to weak health, d'Affry was  again unable to take command of the Swiss Guards defending the Tuileries Palace during the Insurrection of 10 August 1792, and was imprisoned from that day until 2 September. He then briefly resumed his former duties in order to handle the dismissal of the Swiss mercenary regiments, following their abolition by the French government.  He left Paris on 20 October 1792 and died in Saint-Barthélemy, Switzerland on 10 June 1793. 

Louis-Auguste-Augustin d'Affry was married to Marie-Elisabeth d'Alt.  Their son was the Swiss politician , the first Landammann of Switzerland after the Act of Mediation. A freemason, he was a member of the Parisian lodge "Société Olympique" after 1786.

Honors 

 Grand Cross of the Order of Saint Louis (1779).
 Knight of the Order of the Holy Spirit (1784). Louis-Auguste-Augustin d'Affry is the only Swiss in history to have received this title.

References

Bibliography 

1713 births
1793 deaths
People from Versailles
French people of Swiss descent
French Freemasons
Swiss mercenaries
18th-century Swiss military personnel
18th-century French military personnel
Ambassadors of France to the Netherlands
Order of Saint Louis recipients
Order of the Holy Spirit